San Pietro in Amantea is a village and comune in the province of Cosenza in the Calabria region of southern Italy.

Geography
The town is bordered by Aiello Calabro, Amantea, Belmonte Calabro, Lago and Serra d'Aiello.

References

Cities and towns in Calabria